Guttikonda Bilam, also known as Guthikonda Bilam, is a historic cave and a hill in Piduguralla Mandal, Guntur District of Andhra Pradesh, India. Guttikonda or Guthikonda is the name of a nearby village, while "Bilam" is the Sanskrit word for "cave". There are several caves in the region, collectively known as "Guthikonda Caves"; Guttikonda Bilam is the most well-known of these caves.

The cave is located around 3 km south of the Guttikonda village, which lies 15 km from Piduguralla, in the Guntur district.

Biology 

No publications report on the biology of the cave till 2008. It was Mr. Shabuddin Shaik, an enthusiastic M. Sc zoology student of Acharya Nagarjuna University, who discovered tiny milky white creature for the first time in cave Guthikonda. Later isopod taxonomist decided to open a new chapter in Indian Phreatoicidea and identified as a new genus and species and named as Andhracoides shabuddin  in honor of Mr. Shabuddin Shaik by naming the new species for "his child-like curiosity and inherent scientific interest at Taxonomy, Biodiversity & his concern for environment."

The plankton samples of the cave pools, however, yielded only a dense population of stygophilic Mesocyclops sp also during his first visit.

References

Caves of Andhra Pradesh